Berwick Academy (formerly Berwick Community High School) is a coeducational upper school and sixth form located in Berwick-upon-Tweed in the English county of Northumberland. on the border with Scotland.

Previously a community school administered by Northumberland County Council, Berwick Community High School converted to academy status in November 2011 and was renamed Berwick Academy. However the school continues to coordinate with Northumberland County Council for admissions.

Berwick Academy offers GCSEs and BTECs as programmes of study for pupils, while students in the sixth form have the option to study from a range of A-levels.

As of 2020, the school's most recent Ofsted inspection was in 2018, with a judgement of 'inadequate'.

Alumni 
The alumni of Berwick Academy, previously known as Berwick-upon-Tweed Community High School before 2011 include:
 Jeremy Purvis, MSP for Tweeddale, Ettrick and Lauderdale between 2003 and 2011; made a life peer in 2013 and currently sits in the House of Lords as a Liberal Democrat.

References

External links
Berwick Academy official website

Upper schools in Northumberland
Academies in Northumberland